Yann Karamoh (born 8 July 1998) is a French professional footballer who plays as a forward for Italian  club Torino.

Club career

Caen
Born in Abidjan, Karamoh joined Caen in 2011 from Racing Colombes 92. On 7 December 2015, he signed his first professional contract, with a duration of three years.

He made his debut in Ligue 1 on 13 August 2016 in Caen's 3–2 win against Lorient, replacing Ronny Rodelin in the 77th minute. Six days later, he started and played the full 90 minutes in his club's second league match of the season, a 0–2 defeat away to Lyon.

Internazionale
On 31 August 2017, Karamoh joined Serie A club Inter Milan on a two-year loan deal with the obligation to purchase. He made his Serie A debut 24 September 2017 in 1–0 win over Genoa replacing Borja Valero in the 72nd minute. On 11 February 2018, he started in his first league match and scored the winning goal to give Inter a 2–1 win against Bologna.

Loan to Bordeaux
On 31 August 2018, Karamoh returned to France moving to Bordeaux for a season-year loan.

Parma
On 17 July 2019, Karamoh joined Parma on loan for one year with an obligation to make deal permanent.

Torino
On 1 September 2022, Karamoh signed a one-season contract with Torino, with an option to extend for two more seasons.

Career statistics

Club

References

External links

 
 
 

Living people
1998 births
French footballers
France under-21 international footballers
France youth international footballers
Ivorian footballers
French sportspeople of Ivorian descent
Association football midfielders
Ligue 1 players
Serie A players
Süper Lig players
Stade Malherbe Caen players
Inter Milan players
FC Girondins de Bordeaux players
Parma Calcio 1913 players
Fatih Karagümrük S.K. footballers
Torino F.C. players
French expatriate footballers
French expatriate sportspeople in Italy
Expatriate footballers in Italy
French expatriate sportspeople in Turkey
Expatriate footballers in Turkey